Pio Maisamoa Seci (born 19 August 1993) is a Fijian professional rugby league footballer who plays as a er and  for Fiji at international level.

He previously played for the Manly Warringah Sea Eagles in the National Rugby League

Background
Born in Suva, Fiji, Seci grew up in the nearby suburb of Nabua. He played rugby league for the Nabua Broncos from the age of 12. He attended St Agnes Primary School and Queen Victoria School, before earning a scholarship to Good Counsel College in Innsifail.

Playing career
In 2011, Seci played for the Northern Pride in the Mal Meninga Cup, scoring 2 tries. In 2012, he signed with the Canterbury-Bankstown Bulldogs, joining their NYC side. That year, he played for Bankstown Sports in the local Canterbury under-19 competition, scoring seven tries in five games. In 2013, he made his debut for the Canterbury NYC side, playing two games and scoring one try.

In 2014, Seci joined the Easts Tigers' FOGS Cup side. After one season with the Tigers, he returned to Fiji in 2015 to play for his old club, the Nabua Broncos in the Fiji National Rugby League Competition. In October 2017, he was named in Fiji's 2017 Rugby League World Cup squad.
Seci signed with the Ipswich Jets in the Queensland Cup starting in 2018.
In the absence of Penioni Tagituimua, Seci was named captain of the Kaiviti Silktails for their round 11 match against the Hills District Bulls.
In round 20 of the 2022 NRL season, Seci made his first grade debut for Manly in their defeat against the Sydney Roosters.

Personal life
Seci is a first cousin of fellow Fijian representative Tui Kamikamica.

References

External links
2017 RLWC profile
Fiji profile

1993 births
Sportspeople from Suva
Fijian rugby league players
Fiji national rugby league team players
Ipswich Jets players
Manly Warringah Sea Eagles players
Kaiviti Silktails players
Rugby league wingers
Rugby league centres
Living people